The Witch Head is a  white Navajo Sandstone mountain in Zion National Park in Washington County, Utah, United States, that is part of the Towers of the Virgin.

Description
Its neighbors include The West Temple, The Sundial, Altar of Sacrifice, Meridian Tower, Bee Hive, and Three Marys. The first ascent of this feature was made in early March 1997 by Dan Stih and Ron Raimonde via the west face, which they rated a  climb.

Climate
Spring and fall are the most favorable seasons to visit The Witch Head. According to the Köppen climate classification system, it is located in a Cold semi-arid climate zone, which is defined by the coldest month having an average mean temperature below 32 °F (0 °C), and at least 50% of the total annual precipitation being received during the spring and summer.

Gallery

See also

 List of mountains of Utah
 Geology of the Zion and Kolob canyons area
 Colorado Plateau

References

External links

 Zion National Park National Park Service
 Weather forecast
 Web cam

Mountains of Utah
Zion National Park
Mountains of Washington County, Utah
Sandstone formations of the United States
North American 2000 m summits